The A49 is an A road in western England, which traverses the Welsh Marches region.  It runs north from Ross-on-Wye in Herefordshire via Hereford, Leominster, Ludlow, Shrewsbury and Whitchurch, then continues through central Cheshire to Warrington and Wigan before terminating at its junction with the A6 road just south of Bamber Bridge, near the junction of the M6, M65 and M61 motorways.

The stretch between Ross-on-Wye and the A5 at Shrewsbury is a trunk road, maintained by National Highways.

Lancashire

From the A6 at Bamber Bridge, south of Preston, the road runs parallel to the M6 motorway, through Leyland towards Wigan. Through Ashton in Makerfield and Newton-le-Willows, reaching Warrington via Winwick. In June 2020, a new section of the A49 opened forming part of a link between Wigan town centre and junction 25 on the M6, the section it replaced being renumbered B5386.

Cheshire

From junction 9 of the M62, there is a dual-carriageway through Warrington, as far as Loushers Lane (With the exception of a brief stretch northbound after meeting the A57 and another northbound before meeting the A5060 which has one lane reserved for buses during peak hours.). During this section, it passes under the Liverpool to Manchester Line railway (southern route), then has the Cockhedge Green roundabout with the A57 and passes to the east and south of the town centre of Warrington. (Its original north–south route through the town centre is now partly pedestrianised.)

It passes over a roundabout with the A5061 situated on the River Mersey, then goes past Priestley College. It passes over the Manchester Ship Canal, Cheshire Ring Canal Walk and Bridgewater Canal. At Pewterspear there is the Owens Corner roundabout. The road has crossroads with the B5356 at Stretton and meets the A559 at junction 10 of the M56. The road enters Cheshire West And Chester. There is crossroads with the A533 and the road crosses the Cheshire Ring Canal Walk and Trent & Mersey Canal before crossing the Acton swing bridge over the Weaver Navigation.

The  £6 million Weaverham Diversion (near Northwich) opened in September 1992. The old route is now the B5144, passing near Weaverham High School. The road passes over the West Coast Main Line railway after the Weaverham Roundabout. The section from Weaverham to Cuddington is a new much-straightened section. At Bryn, north of Cuddington, it passes the former site of Lactalis-Nestlé that made Ski and Munch Bunch yoghurts, closing in 2007 with production moving to central Europe, having made yoghurt since 1968. In Cuddington it crosses the Mid-Cheshire Line near Cuddington railway station. There is the Oakmere Crossroads with the A556 (a Roman road) south of Cuddington, before the road crosses the Whitegate Way.  It then crosses the A54 near Abbots Moss Hall, and the road passes through Cotebrook, near Little Budworth Country Park.

The  £3.8 million Tarporley Bypass opened in September 1986. The A51 overlaps the A49. Tarporley Community High School is near here. The road leaves the A51 to the west at Four Lane Ends near the Red Fox. The road travels over the Shropshire Union Canal and under the Welsh Marches Line railway (to Hereford) south of Tiverton. It crosses over the River Gowy north of Bunbury next to the Beeston Castle (named after the real Beeston Castle to the west).

The road briefly overlaps the A534 Wrexham Road from the junction at Ridley and crosses over the River Weaver. At Cholmondeley there is Cholmondeley Castle. At the crossroads of Bickerton Road (for the castle) and Wrenbury Road, there is the Cholmondeley Arms. Moving from the parishes of Cholmondeley to Bickley east of Moss Wood, it also moves back into Cheshire West and Chester. It crosses the Shropshire Union Canal (Llangollen Canal) again at Tushingham cum Grindley, where it crosses into Marbury cum Quoisley and back into Cheshire East. The road enters into Shropshire and is crossed by the South Cheshire Way near Hinton.

Shropshire
The Whitchurch bypass begins with a roundabout with the B5476, the old route through the town. The  £13.7m Whitchurch Bypass (also part of the A41) opened in July 1992. It passes near Sir John Talbot's Technology College (on the A525), then crosses over the railway and also overlaps the A525 (Newcastle-under-Lyme to Rhyl). It follows a Roman road southwards.

The  £1.3m Prees Bypass opened in August 1988. There is a staggered crossroads with the B5065, then the road passes over the River Roden. The Welsh Marches Line follows to the west. The Shrewsbury bypass starts at the Battlefield Roundabout (near scene of Battle of Shrewsbury) with the A53 and A5124, near a Travelodge. There is a roundabout with the B5062. The bypass travels over the River Severn and under the railway and overlaps the A5 from the Preston Island roundabout. Shrewsbury was bypassed when the £64m east-west A5 bypass was built in August 1992.

The route leaves the A5 at the Bayston Hill Roundabout on the south of the bypass, with the A5112 heading into Shrewsbury. It goes through Bayston Hill, passing the Compasses Inn. It passes near Lyth Hill Country Park, following the Welsh Marches Line (until Woofferton). It crosses the Cound Brook near the Bridge Innbefore passing through Dorrington, with The Horseshoes and over the railway. Through Leebotwood it passes The Pound.

The road passes through the Stretton Gap on an alignment that was constructed in the late 1930s. Several stretches of the road follow the route of the Roman Road: Watling Street. The upgraded route bypasses All Stretton, Church Stretton and Little Stretton. The original route is the B5477 (former B4370) to the west. At a crossroads near Church Stretton railway station, the road meets the B4371. Further south it meets the B4370  (west) at Marshbrook. At Upper Affcot it passes the White House. The road meets the A489 at Wistanstow. At Craven Arms, there is the Shropshire Hills Discovery Centre, and it meets the east-west B4368. At Onibury, there is a level crossing, one of only a few on trunk roads in England. The section from Shrewsbury to Ludlow is prone to crashes.

At Bromfield, the road meets the A4113, and crosses the River Onny. Near the B4365 junction the road is crossed by the Shropshire Way. The  £4m Ludlow Bypass opened in the summer of 1979. The bypass passes over then under the railway, then over the River Teme. The former route of the A49 is the B4361. After the bypass, the road passes over the railway. At Woofferton, there is a T-junction with the A456, and a staggered junction with the B4362. Woofferton has a large radio transmitting station (the Woofferton transmitting station) with a Mediumwave transmitter for BBC Hereford and Worcester.

Herefordshire

The road enters Herefordshire. The  £1.4 million Brimfield Bypass opened in March 1983. South of Ashton the road passes through the Capability Brown parkland of Berrington Hall. The  £9m Leominster Bypass opened in November 1988. At the southern end of the Leominster Bypass the A49 passes the Cadbury's Marlbrook chocolate factory. Shortly after, the A417 route to Gloucester begins at a junction shortly before the A49 makes its way up Dinmore hill past Queenswood Country Park. The south bound carriageway is 2-lane up the hill and the north bound carriageway is 2-lane heading up the other side of the hill. This can be a common section for accidents and skid-offs.

The road then swings towards Wellington with a short section of dual-carriageway. The A49 then reaches Hereford, the only major destination on the road without a bypass. The road passes right through the city centre, causing serious congestion on both the north and south sides of the River Wye. The dual-carriageway Greyfrairs bridge over the Wye opened in 1967. The A49 meets the A438 at the Edgar Street Roundabout. The road then swings south-eastwards out of Hereford, meeting the A465 at the Belmont Roundabout. At Ross-on-Wye the road ends, joining the A40 and B4260 at the Wilton Roundabout.

History of the road number

The original (1923) route of the A49 was Ross-on-Wye to Bamber Bridge (near Preston), but there have been some changes in its course.  The A49 used to start on the A40 at Old Pike, west of Ross, as the original route of the A40 was through Skenfrith.  When the A40 was rerouted via Monmouth in 1935, the A49 was extended to Ross.

At a later date, the A49 was rerouted between Shrewsbury and Whitchurch.  The 1923 route was via Wem, but the road now passes close to Prees.  Much of the current route was originally the B5064.

References

External links

 BBC News Enquiry into A49 safety.
 Sabre Roads

Roads in England
Roads in Cheshire
Roads in Greater Manchester
Roads in Herefordshire
Roads in Lancashire
Roads in Merseyside
Roads in Shropshire